The 2014 Toyota Racing Series was the tenth running of the Toyota Racing Series, the premier open-wheeler motorsport category held in New Zealand.  The series, which consists of five meetings of three races, began on 11 January at Teretonga Park in Invercargill and ended on 9 February with the 59th running of the New Zealand Grand Prix, at Manfeild Autocourse in Feilding.

Teams and drivers
All teams are New-Zealand registered.

Race calendar and results
The calendar for the series was announced on 4 July 2013, and will be held over five successive weekends in January and February. The series will visit Highlands Motorsport Park for the first time. The Highlands round will be supporting the V8SuperTourer series, whereas the Teretonga and Timaru rounds will be supporting the New Zealand V8s. Both touring car championships will be part of the New Zealand Grand Prix meeting at Manfeild.

Championship standings
In order for a driver to score championship points, they had to complete at least 75% of the race winner's distance. All races counted towards the final championship standings.

Scoring system

Drivers' Championship

Teams' Championship

References

External links

Toyota Racing Series
Toyota Racing Series